Agricultural railways in Western Australia were a system of railway lines that were built after the Western Australian 1905 Royal Commission on Immigration, which stated the need for a policy that "all considerable areas of agricultural land must have a 15 mile rail service."  The lines were designed and constructed by the Public Works Department of Western Australia, for the Western Australian Government Railways.

Royal commissions 
The Western Australian 1947 Royal Commission into the Management Workings and Control of the Western Australian Government Railways also placed these railway lines and their construction into context:

In order to carry out the wishes of the Government to construct railway in agricultural areas as cheaply as possible, lines were built with 45 lb rail sections which practically followed the surface of the ground, with (a) earth ballasting (b) half round timber sleepers (c) providing the bare minimum station facilities.

The 1947 commission called these lines spur lines at time of construction, in distinction to loop lines, however the completion of most sections made most lines loop lines.

The 1947 royal commission report also made a distinction between Southern Agricultural Spur Lines, Northern Agricultural Spur Lines, and South West dairy and timber lines; these broadly relate to geographical regions.

In the 2000s the lines were collectively identified as Wheatbelt railway lines of Western Australia.

Agricultural spur lines

See also
 Western Australian Government Railways

Notes

Western Australian Government Railways
Wheatbelt railway lines of Western Australia
Industrial railways in Australia